In mathematical logic, Morley rank, introduced by , is a means of measuring the size of a subset of a  model of a theory, generalizing the notion of dimension in algebraic geometry.

Definition
Fix a theory T with a model M. The Morley rank of a  formula φ defining a definable (with parameters) subset S of M 
is an ordinal or −1 or ∞, defined by first recursively defining what it means for a formula to have Morley rank at least α for some ordinal α. 
The Morley rank is at least 0 if S is non-empty.
For α a successor ordinal, the Morley rank is at least α if in some elementary extension N of M, the set S has countably infinitely many disjoint definable subsets Si, each of rank at least α − 1.
For α a non-zero limit ordinal, the Morley rank is at least α if it is at least β for all β less than α.
The Morley rank is then defined to be α if it is at least α but not at least α + 1, and is defined to be ∞ if it is at least α for all ordinals α, and is defined to be −1 if S is empty.

For a definable subset of a model M (defined by a formula φ) the Morley rank is defined to be the Morley rank of φ in any ℵ0-saturated elementary extension of M. In particular for ℵ0-saturated models the Morley rank of a subset is the Morley rank of any formula defining the subset.

If φ defining S has rank α, and S breaks up into no more than n < ω subsets of rank α, then φ is said to have Morley degree n.  A formula defining a finite set has Morley rank 0.  A formula with Morley rank 1 and Morley degree 1 is called strongly minimal.  A strongly minimal structure is one where the trivial formula x = x is strongly minimal.  Morley rank and strongly minimal structures are key tools in the proof of Morley's categoricity theorem and in the larger area of model theoretic stability theory.

Examples
The empty set has Morley rank −1, and conversely anything of Morley rank −1 is empty.
A subset has Morley rank 0 if and only if it is finite and non-empty.
If V is an algebraic set in Kn, for an algebraically closed field K, then the Morley rank of V is the same as its usual Krull dimension. The Morley degree of V is the number of irreducible components of maximal dimension; this is not the same as its degree in algebraic geometry, except when its components of maximal dimension are linear spaces.
The rational numbers, considered as an ordered set, has Morley rank ∞, as it contains a countable disjoint union of definable subsets isomorphic to itself.

See also
Cherlin–Zilber conjecture
Group of finite Morley rank
U-rank

References
Alexandre Borovik,   Ali Nesin,   "Groups of finite Morley rank", Oxford Univ. Press  (1994)
B. Hart Stability theory and its variants (2000) pp. 131–148 in Model theory, algebra and geometry, edited by D. Haskell et al., Math. Sci. Res. Inst. Publ. 39, Cambridge Univ. Press, New York, 2000. Contains a formal definition of Morley rank.
David Marker Model Theory of Differential Fields (2000) pp. 53–63 in Model theory, algebra and geometry, edited by D. Haskell et al., Math. Sci. Res. Inst. Publ. 39, Cambridge Univ. Press, New York, 2000.

Model theory